Zschernig v. Miller, 389 U.S. 429 (1968), was a case in which the Supreme Court of the United States invalidated an Oregon statute for unconstitutionally intruding into the federal realm of foreign affairs even though the statute did not conflict with any federal treaty or statute.

Introduction 
An Oregon resident died and their only heirs were residents of East Germany.  When the heirs tried to claim their inheritance, the Stand Land Board attempted to escheat the funds because East Germany would not allow the inheritance if the countries involved were reversed.

Facts of the case 
The Oregon law at issue in the case provided that a nonresident alien could not inherit property from an Oregon decedent unless: 1) the alien's government granted Americans the right to inherit on the same terms as its own citizens, 2) the alien's government gave Americans the right to receive payment in the U.S. from foreign funds, and 3) the alien was able to receive "the benefit, use or control" of the Oregon bequest "without confiscation" by the alien's government.

Decision 
The court found the law unconstitutional because of "intrusion by the State into the field of foreign affairs which the Constitution entrusts to the President and the Congress."Zschernig, 389 U.S. at 432. The Supreme Court applied Zschernig in American Insurance Association v. Garamendi, a 2003 case, although they relied more on Justice Harlan's concurring opinion in Zschernig than on the majority's reasoning.

See also 
 American Insurance Association v. Garamendi (2003): case over California law with foreign policy implications

References

External links
 
 

United States Supreme Court cases
United States Supreme Court cases of the Warren Court
United States Constitution Article Two case law
United States federalism case law
1968 in United States case law
Legal history of Oregon
Germany–United States relations
East Germany–United States relations
Inheritance tax